Hezi may refer to:

People
 Hezi Bezalel (born 1951), Israeli businessman
 Hezi Eshel (born 1931), retired Israel Defense Forces lieutenant colonel
 Hezi Leskali (1952–1994), Israeli artist
 Hezi Levi, commander of the Israeli Medical Corps from 2002 to 2007
 Hezi Shai (born 1954), Israeli tank commander
 Hezi Shayb, Israeli businessman

Other uses
 Hezi (town) (鹤子镇), Anyuan County, Jiangxi, China
 Hezi SM-1, a variant of the M1 carbine
 Hezi or Dudou, a form of women's undershirt worn in Tang China
 Xu Hezi, main character of the Chinese television series High Flying Songs of Tang Dynasty

See also
 Hezilo of Hildesheim, 11th-century Bishop of Hildesheim
 Hazi (Hazi Aslanov; 1910–1945), Soviet major-general